Brassed Off is a 1996 British comedy-drama film written and directed by Mark Herman and starring Pete Postlethwaite, Tara Fitzgerald and Ewan McGregor.

The film is about the troubles faced by a colliery brass band, following the closure of their pit. The soundtrack for the film was provided by the Grimethorpe Colliery Band, and the plot is based on Grimethorpe's own struggles against pit closures. It has been generally very positively received for its role in promoting brass bands and their music. Parts of the film make reference to the huge increase in suicides that resulted from the end of the coal industry in Britain, and the struggle to retain hope in the circumstances.

In the United States, the film was promoted simply as a romantic comedy involving McGregor and Fitzgerald's characters.

Context
The film is set ten years after the year-long strike in 1984–85 by the National Union of Mineworkers in Britain. Before the privatisation of British Coal, a wave of pit closures took place. Depleted of resources and in debt following the labour militancy of 1984–85, the miners were unable to continue a resistance against the policies of the government. Many had been in debt ever since the long strike, and were prepared to take redundancy money whilst it was on offer.

The National Coal Board (NCB) arranged private ballots to determine between closing a pit immediately with compulsory redundancies or taking a pit to a review procedure to determine whether the pit should be privatised.

Although miners had a tradition of fighting for their jobs, the risk of losing the redundancy money on offer by going forwards to privatisation swung the votes in most ballots to be in favour of pit closure and redundancy. The loss of hope, pride and fighting spirit in what were previously proud mining communities was the basis for the idea of being "brassed off", an expression used in the North of England, meaning "angry".

Beginning in early 1993, groups of miners' wives camped outside some pits' gates and outside the Department of Trade and Industry in London. This is referred to in the film. It contrasts with the muted response from the mineworkers, some of whom sang Shut the pit! to the tune of the song Here We Go! from the 1984–85 strike.

Plot
Gloria Mullins has been sent to her home town of Grimley to determine the profitability of the pit for the management of British Coal. She also plays the flugelhorn, and is allowed to play with the local brass band after playing Concierto de Aranjuez, affectionately known as “Orange Juice” by the characters, with them. The band is made up of miners from whom she must conceal her purpose. She renews a childhood romance with Andy Barrow, which soon leads to complications. Andy is bitter about the programme of pit closures and determined to fight on, but he is also realistic about the circumstances and predicts a 4-to-1 majority for closure and redundancy. When Andy realises that Gloria is working for management, he accuses her of naïvety for thinking that the Coal Board is considering whether the pit has any viable future and argues that the decision to close Grimley would have been taken years earlier. It is later revealed, during a confrontation between Gloria and the management of the colliery, that the decision to close the colliery had been made two years previously, and that this was to have gone ahead regardless of the findings of her report; the report was simply a public relations exercise to placate the miners and members of the public sympathetic to their plight.

The passionate band conductor, Danny Ormondroyd, finds he is fighting a losing battle to keep the rest of the band members committed. His son, Phil, is badly in debt and becomes a clown for children's parties, but this fails to prevent his wife and children walking out on him. In debt, Phil votes for the redundancy money, which he becomes ashamed of. As Danny collapses in the street and is hospitalised, Phil suffers a mental breakdown while entertaining a group of children, as part of a harvest festival in a church. He refers to himself as "Coco the scab"—a name that he had been called by a debt collector who he had asked to wait until the redundancy money had come through. Eventually, he attempts suicide by trying to hang himself, but is taken to the hospital. Phil reveals to Danny that in light of the colliery's closure, the band has decided not to continue playing.

When band member Jim realises that Gloria is working for management, he is unimpressed with Andy's relationship with her.  In a pub conversation, the other miners are not particularly concerned and feel that Jim is being too harsh on Andy.  When Andy says that he should be old enough to make his own decisions, Jim responds with, "Old enough to be a scab then?" The pub falls silent at the accusation, as the word was an extremely serious insult in a mining community and implies treachery to the working class. Jim then withdraws the insult and says that Andy is just "stupid". Later on in the film, Jim asks Gloria to leave the band and mocks her attempts to fund the band's trip to the National Finals.

With the intention that it will be their last performance, the band, in full uniform, and wearing their miners' helmets and lamps, plays Danny Boy (the famous Percy Grainger arrangement of Londonderry Air) late at night outside the hospital. Andy, having lost his tenor horn in a bet, whistles along with his hands in his pockets. After they finish, they all switch off their lamps.

Whilst the band is playing in the National Semi-Finals, the outcome of the ballot is announced as 4-to-1 in favour of redundancy, as Andy had predicted.

After Gloria sets up a bank account to fund travel to the National Finals, the band is brought back together to compete. Andy wins his tenor horn back in a game of pool, and having forgiven Gloria, after she gives them the money she was paid to compile the report (saying she does not want it because it's "dirty money"), the band travels to the final at the Royal Albert Hall in London (Birmingham Town Hall was used to film these scenes), where they are amused by the inability of the woman on the dressing room's PA system to pronounce 'colliery'. Before departing, Phil leaves a note for Danny saying that they are going to the finals. Danny arrives just in time to see the band win the competition with a stirring rendition of the finale from William Tell Overture, during which Phil notices his wife and children are in the audience. Danny refuses to accept the trophy, stating that it is only human beings that matter and not music or the trophy and that "this bloody government has systematically destroyed an entire industry. Our industry. And not just our industry—our communities, our homes, our lives. All in the name of 'progress'. And for a few lousy bob." However, following this gesture, Jim takes the trophy anyway. The band celebrates their victory as Andy and Gloria kiss on the upper deck of an open-topped bus travelling through London, while the rest of the band play Land of Hope and Glory conducted by Danny.

Cast

Production
The film is set in "Grimley" in the mid-1990s, which is a thin veil for Grimethorpe, a mining village in South Yorkshire which had been named as the poorest village in Britain in 1994 by the European Union. The nearby areas of the Dearne Valley and the Hemsworth area were also identified as in need of serious aid. The soundtrack for the film was recorded by the Grimethorpe Colliery Band, the story roughly reflects Grimethorpe Colliery Band's history, and the film was largely shot in Grimethorpe.

Reception
Brassed Off received an 80% approval rating on Rotten Tomatoes based on 49 reviews, with an average rating of 6.8/10. The site's critics consensus reads: "Brassed Off combines inspiring drama with populist socioeconomics to create a film whose familiar outlines are filled in with genuine and surprisingly palpable emotion."

The film was one of Film Four Distributors first major releases and opened on 203 screens in the UK with a gross of £466,058 in its opening weekend, finishing third at the UK box office behind Dragonheart and The Nutty Professor. It went on to gross £2,128,437 in the UK.

The film's reputation has grown considerably since its initial release. Brassed Off is ranked 85th on the BFI list of Top 100 British Films A reevaluation in 2018 concluded, "Like Danny’s speech at the Royal Albert Hall, the film is honest, poignant and powerful. Twenty years on, its message is still all too relevant. And the music is bloody great, by the way."

Soundtrack
The film score for Brassed Off includes a large number of pieces from the brass band repertoire, played by the Grimethorpe Colliery Band conducted by John Anderson, alongside an original score composed by Trevor Jones.

Track listing

Certifications

Stage adaptation
Paul Allen adapted Mark Herman's screenplay for the stage, the production premiering at the Crucible Theatre Sheffield on 17 March 1998, with music performed by the Grimethorpe Colliery Band. The play transferred to the Royal National Theatre in June before embarking on a UK tour. In 2014 a new UK tour was mounted by the Touring Consortium Theatre Company, coinciding with the thirtieth anniversary of the miners' strike.

In popular culture
A sample of a monologue performed by the main character Danny (Pete Postlethwaite) is used in the opening of the song "Tubthumping", on the 1997 Chumbawamba album Tubthumper: "Truth is, I thought it mattered; I thought that music mattered. But does it bollocks! Not compared to how people matter".

See also
 BFI Top 100 British films
 The Full Monty (1997)
 Billy Elliot (2000)
 Pride (2014 film)

References

External links

 
 
 

1996 films
1996 comedy-drama films
British comedy-drama films
Mining in South Yorkshire
Films about music and musicians
Films about the labor movement
Films set in Yorkshire
Films set in 1992
Best Foreign Film César Award winners
Films shot in England
Film4 Productions films
Miramax films
Films scored by Trevor Jones
Films shot in Greater Manchester
Films directed by Mark Herman
Films set in mining communities
1990s English-language films
1990s British films